= Vuk Mirčetić =

Serbian politician

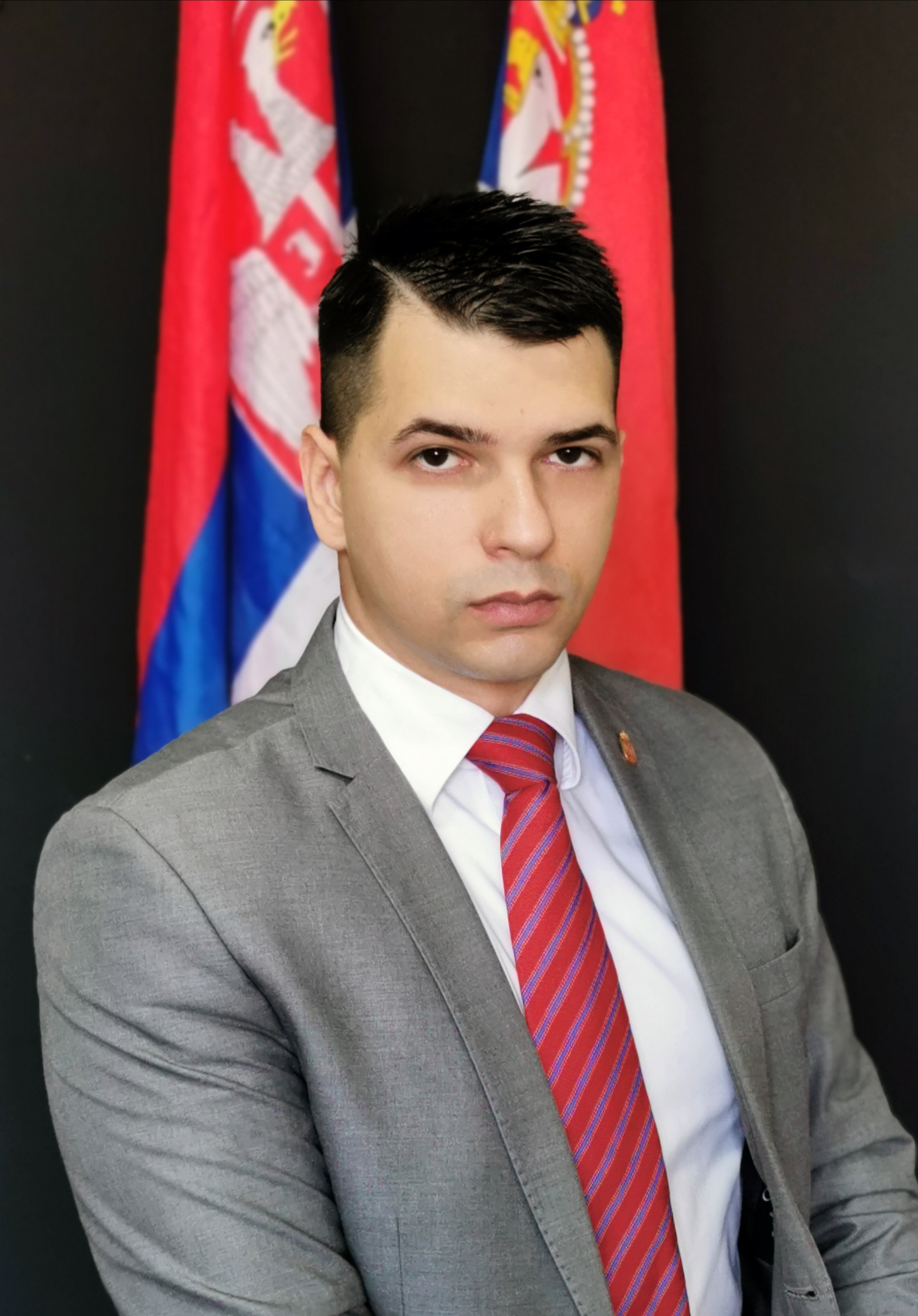
Vuk Mirčetić

Vuk Mirčetić (Serbian Cyrillic: Вук Мирчетић; born 5 January 1989) is a politician in Serbia. He has served in the National Assembly of Serbia since 2020 as a member of the Serbian Progressive Party.

== Early life and private career ==
Mirčetić was born in Belgrade, in what was then the Socialist Republic of Serbia in the Socialist Federal Republic of Yugoslavia. He has a master's degree in economics from the Faculty of Applied Management, Economics and Finance, a private academic institution founded in 2000. He continues to work as a teaching assistant at this institution. He is also chief executive officer and a lecturer at Belgrade's Institute for Law and Finance and is involved in other academic and leadership pursuits, including leading the non-governmental organization Development Center-a.

== Politician ==
Mirčetić was an assistant to the mayor of the Belgrade municipality of Voždovac from 2014 until his election to the national assembly in 2020. His online biography indicates that he is a member of the Progressive Party's main board and a commissioner on its municipal board in Voždovac.

=== Parliamentarian ===
Mirčetić was given the 169th position on the Progressive Party's Aleksandar Vučić — For Our Children electoral list in the 2020 parliamentary election and was elected when the list won a landslide majority with 188 out of 250 mandates. He is now a member of the assembly's culture and information committee and the committee on constitutional and legislative issues, a deputy member of the European integration committee, the leader of Serbia's parliamentary friendship group with Angola, and a member of the parliamentary friendship groups with Algeria, Armenia, Australia, Bahrain, Canada, China, Cuba, Denmark, Egypt, Finland, Germany, Iceland, India, Indonesia, Iran, Israel, Japan, Kuwait, Lebanon, Luxembourg, Malaysia, Malta, Mexico, Nepal, Norway, Qatar, Romania, Russia, Slovenia, South Korea, Spain, the countries of Sub-Saharan Africa, Switzerland, Turkey, the United Arab Emirates, and the United States of America.
